The 2013 Waterfront Communications crisis is the name of a comprehensive lobbying scandal in Denmark.

References

2013 in Denmark
2013 scandals
Scandals in Denmark